Vetal is an unincorporated community in Bennett County, in the U.S. state of South Dakota.

History 
The community was named for Vetal Valandry, a pioneer settler.
A post office was established in 1912, and remained in operation until 1967.

Education
The Bennett County School District serves all of Bennett County.

References

Unincorporated communities in Bennett County, South Dakota
Unincorporated communities in South Dakota